Maine Grains is an American supplier of stone milled flour, rolled oats, and other grains for culinary use. Based in Skowhegan, Maine, the company operates its gristmill in a former Somerset County jail building.

During the COVID-19 pandemic, Maine Grains saw a 4,000 percent increase in online sales. The company employs about 20 workers, milling roughly 2,000 tons of flour per year.

Leadership 
Amber Lambke is the co-founder and CEO of Maine Grains. She also serves as co-founder of the Maine Grain Alliance, a trade association serving the state's grain community.

References 

Food and drink companies of the United States
Food and drink companies based in Maine
Baking mixes
Skowhegan, Maine